Volume 4 is the third studio album of Banda Calypso (fourth CD in all).

Content 
After three albums and dissemination ever growing the band has launches this disc, which contains classics like Pra Te Esquecer, Imagino, and other major successes that have not had the need to be launched as "single" to have major repercussions. This album also contains the diversity of rhythms that the band always has, but now with more experience, sound quality and a wider audience. Unlike previous albums, singing next to Joelma is not Dinho but Edú Luppa, a great partner and composer of the band that sings the tracks Uma Rosa and Maria.

Problems 
The album would be released in the beginning was plagiarized by a paraense group, so Joelma and Chimbinha filed a lawsuit, but despite the problems soon released Volume 4 disc and surpassed the most brand 900,000 copies.

Comments 
In addition to the hit singles, one of the album's highlights was the song Homem Perfeito, the diversity of rhythms contained in a single composition: it contains Bolero, forró, salsa, Cumbia, lambada, and so bringing a particular attention to the song, and many comments on their performances in television programs. As in the two previous albums there was a Potpourri of carimbó, but now sung by Joelma, but this band got more comment on your live performance on the disc Banda Calypso na Amazônia. The album was released shortly before the live DVD recording in São Paulo

Track listing

2003 albums
Banda Calypso albums